Nexus International School (Singapore) (NISS) is located at Aljunied Walk where its new campus now stands. It moved over to Aljunied in January 2020 from its previous location in Ulu Pandan Road off Pandan Valley. The school caters from Nursery up to Year 13 (ages 3 to 18).

NISS enrolled its first learners in July 2011 and has over 1,200 students from around 56 countries.

NISS is a member of the Council of International Schools (CIS), an approved Cambridge International Examinations (CIE) Centre, EduTrust certified, an Apple Distinguished School, fully accredited by the Western Association of Schools and Colleges (WASC), and is also an authorised International Baccalaureate (IB) World School, authorised to offer the IB Primary Years Programme (PYP) and Diploma Programme (DP). 

Its facilities include an Olympic-sized swimming pool, two gymnasiums, a two-tiered theatre, double-storey library, and a FIFA and World Rugby specified AstroTurf pitch. Co-curricular activities such as Swimming, Hip Hop, Taekwondo, Drama, Learn the Piano, Race Car Engineering and Make & Build your own Skate Park are offered. NISS also participates in sports competitions organised by the Athletic Conference of Singapore International Schools and has been the official host for the FINA Swimming World Cup Swim Meets since 2017.

The academic year runs from August to June.

New campus 
In late 2017, the school announced that they would move to a new campus in Aljunied located at Aljunied Walk off Aljunied Road. The new campus features a 12-storey building that has enough space for 2,000 students and includes an Olympic-sized swimming pool, a large auditorium and a 2-storey library. The school moved over to their new location in December 2019 and opened its doors in January 2020.

Alumni 
 Eleanor Lee, Singaporean actress and singer currently based in China

References

External links 

[./Https://honeykidsasia.com/nexus-international-school-singapore/ Nexus International School Parent Reviews]

Cambridge schools in Singapore
International schools in Singapore
International Baccalaureate schools in Singapore